Patient X may refer to:
Patient X (film), a 2009 Filipino horror film
"Patient X" (The X-Files), an episode from the American science fiction series The X-Files